Nujorki Sungoh is an Indian politician. He was 1st  elected to the Meghalaya Legislative Assembly from 4 Mowkaiaw assembly Constituency in the 2018 Meghalaya Legislative Assembly election and  he was reelected for second time in the 2023 Meghalaya Legislative Assembly Election as a member of the  United Democratic Party.

References

1989 births
Living people
United Democratic Party (Meghalaya) politicians
People from West Jaintia Hills district
Meghalaya MLAs 2018–2023